Cypress is a former provincial electoral division in Manitoba, Canada.  It was located in the south of the province.

Cypress was created for the 1886 provincial election, and abolished with the 1969 election.

Provincial representatives

Election results

Former provincial electoral districts of Manitoba